is a private junior college in Minoh, Osaka, Japan, established in 1967 and closed on March 31, 2021.

External links
 Official website

Educational institutions established in 1967
Educational institutions disestablished in 2021
2021 disestablishments in Japan
Private universities and colleges in Japan
Universities and colleges in Osaka Prefecture
Japanese junior colleges